Commerzbank AG is a significant German universal bank, formally headquartered in Frankfurt since 1990 after successive locations in Hamburg (1870-1905), Berlin (1905-1945), a period of postwar fragmentation (1945-1958), and Düsseldorf (1958-1990). From its founding in 1870, it grew through a number of acquisitions including that in 2008-2009 of Dresdner Bank, a rescue operation through which the German government became the reference shareholder of the combined entity.

By 2018, Commerzbank was present in more than 50 countries around the world and provided almost a third of Germany's trade finance. In 2017, it handled 13 million customers in Germany and 5 million customers in Central and Eastern Europe.

History

1870-1918

In 1873, the bank sponsored the creation of an affiliate in London, the London and Hanseatic Bank, of which it subscribed about half of the shares. By 1891, it had become the largest bank in Hamburg by total lending. It participated in the rapid industrial and commercial development of the German Empire by providing trade finance, credit to small businesses, and investments in various industries that included shipping, electricity generation, mining, chemistry, and manufacturing.

In 1905, it acquired Berliner Bank (est. 1889 following the liquidation of the cooperative Berliner Handelsbank e.G., est. 1878) and from then until 1931 maintained two head offices in Hamburg and Berlin, the latter at Behrensstrasse 46 / Charlottenstrasse 47. It awquired a number of regional and private banks, including B. Magnus (est. 1826 in Hanover) in 1897 and Altonaer Bank (Altona) in 1910. During World War I, the London and Hanseatic Bank subsidiary was seized by the British authorities, together with other German-owned banks. In 1917, Commerz started an acquisition spree of around 40 local banks until 1923.

1918-1933

In 1920, the bank acquired Mitteldeutsche Privat-Bank (est. 1856 in Magdeburg) and renamed itself Commerz- und Privat-Bank AG, by which it gained a dense branch network in the provinces of Saxony and Thuringia. In 1923, it took 25 percent ownership of Rigaer Internationale Bank in Riga, which would be liquidated in 1933; that same year, to cope with hyperinflation, it employed a total of 26,000 staff in 319 locations, the densest branch network among German banks; by end-1923, after hyperinflation ended, the headcount fell to 10,200. In 1927, Commerzbank increased business in the US by establishing an office in New York In 1928, together with Chase Securities Corp. and Halsey, Stuart & Co., it co-founded General Mortgage and Credit Corporation, a long-term lender to small businesses.

As a consequence, the Reichsbank held 69 or 70 percent of the merged entity's capital through its subsidiary the Deutsche Golddiskontbank. In November 1932, Commerz- und Privatbank chief executive  and chairman  were among the signatories of the Industrielleneingabe petition of business leaders that advised President Paul von Hindenburg to appoint Adolf Hitler as chancellor.

1933-1945

The Commerz- und Privat-Bank paid its first dividend in five years in 1935, and returned to private ownership in 1936-1937. In line with the Nazi policy of aryanization, the bank discarded its Jewish staff, which by 1933 represented around 14 percent of its senior executives and 1.6 percent of overall employees. Supervisory board members  and Albert Katzenellenbogen left in 1933 and 1937 respectively, as did management board member Ludwig Berliner in 1933; all three would be murdered in the early 1940s under the Final Solution policy. By 1938, Commerzbank no longer had any Jewish employees. In 1939, it closed its office in New York. By September 1939, it had 6,900 employees, of which 16 percent were mobilized into the Wehrmacht. In 1940, it adopted the name Commerzbank AG, by which it had already been referred to for a long time, as its formal name together with a new logo. 

Through the 1938 Anschluss, annexation of the Sudetenland, and during World War II, it opened branches and subsidiaries in the expanded German territory and also benefited from the expropriation or sale under duress of Jewish-owned banks. In 1940, it opened a branch in Strasbourg. In November 1941 it established Hansabank AG in Riga, with operations in Reval (December 1941) and Dorpat (December 1942), and in 1942, Hansabank NV / Banque Hanséatique SA in Brussels. In the former Yugoslavia, it took minority stakes of 6 and 10 percent respectively in Bankverein AG Belgrad and Bankverein für Kroatien AG in 1941, both carved out from the former Allgemeiner Jugoslawischer Bankverein which itself had been a product of dismantling Wiener Bankverein in the 1920s. In 1942 it also took a 10 percent stake in Böhmische Industrial-Bank in Prague, and 10 percent in the newly established Deutsche Bank für Ostasien intended to develop trade with Imperial Japan. By late 1944, the bank's balance sheet size had tripled from its 1938 level, with two-thirds of the assets being German government debt. In comparative terms, however, it had been less expansionist and ideologically aligned than other large German banks, particularly Deutsche Bank and Dresdner Bank, and in 1942 fell from third to fourth place among German joint-stock banks. In early 1945, it relocated its head office from Berlin to Hamburg as a precautionary measure.

1945-2008

By the end of the war, the former head office and close to half of the bank's branches were in the Soviet occupation zone, where they were promptly nationalized and liquidated. Of the 119 locations in West Germany, 42 were fully destroyed, 35 severely damaged, and 42 in working condition. In 1947-1948, these were first reorganized into nine groups of branches, intended to be operationally independent: Bankverein Westdeutschland (Düsseldorf), Hansa-Bank (Hamburg), Merkur-Bank (Hanover), and Holsten-Bank (Kiel) in the British occupation zone; Mittelrheinische Bank (Mainz) in the French zone; and Mitteldeutsche Creditbank (Frankfurt), Bankverein für Württemberg-Baden (Stuttgart), Bayerische Disconto-Bank (Nuremberg), and Bremer Handels-Bank (Bremen) in the American zone. In August 1949, the bank resterted operations in West Berlin, first as Bankhaus Holbeck, renamed Bankgesellschaft Berlin AG in October, and later Berliner Commerzbank AG. In September 1952, in order to expand credit provision to the German economy, the nine West German entities were consolidated by law into three: Bankverein Westdeutschland AG, renamed Commerzbank-Bankverein AG in 1956, in Düsseldorf; Commerz- und Disconto-Bank AG in Hamburg; and Commerz- und Credit-Bank AG in Frankfurt. On , the Düsseldorf entity acquired the other two and changed its name back to Commerzbank AG.

In 1952, the Commerzbank group restarted an international activity by opening a representative office in Rio de Janeiro, followed by Amsterdam and Madrid in 1953, Beirut in 1957, and Tokyo in 1961, the first German bank to open in postwar Japan. in 1967, Commerzbank established a representative office in New York City. That same year, it joined with Irving Trust, First National Bank of Chicago, Westminster Bank, and HSBC to form the International Commercial Bank in London. In 1969, Commerzbank opened a subsidiary in Luxembourg, Commerzbank International SA (CISAL), which for many years was its largest foreign subsidiary. In 1971, the New York office was converted into a branch, the first by a German bank in the postwar United States. Commerzbank opened further branches in London in 1973, in Paris in 1976 (also the first there by a German bank in postwar times), and in Hong Kong in 1979.

They immediately formed a 50-50 joint venture for U.S. securities business, Europartners Securities Corporation, which absorbed Crédit Lyonnais's New York investment banking operation. In 1974, Commerzbank and Crédit Lyonnais merged their operations in Saarland into a joint venture majority owned by Commerzbank and called Commerz-Credit-Bank AG Europartner, with seat in Saarbrücken and small minority stakes by the other two Europartner banks. In 1984, Commerzbank acquired a 10 percent stake in BHA, and BHA in turn took a 5 percent stake in Commerzbank in 1989. In 1988, Commerzbank acquired full ownership of Europartners Securities Corporation in New York from Crédit Lyonnais, and subsequently renamed it Commerzbank Capital Markets Corporation. The Europartners alliance was eventually brought to an end in 1992.

In 1971, Commerzbank acquired majority stakes in mortgage banks Rheinische Hypothekenbank in Mannheim and Westdeutsche Bodenkreditanstalt in Cologne, and merged them in 1974. From June 1990, it expanded again into the former German Democratic Republic, starting with a branch in Halle inaugurated by German Foreign Minister Hans-Dietrich Genscher.

In 1994, Commerzbank became a shareholder of Bank Rozwoju Eksportu in Poland (est. 1986), renamed mBank in 2013, and has been its majority owner since 2000. In 2005-2006, it took over Eurohypo, a mortgage bank that had been created in 2003 as a joint venture with Deutsche Bank and Dresdner Bank. In 2007 it acquired Bank Forum in Ukraine, but divested it in 2012.

Since 2008

In several steps between August 2008 and January 2009, Commerzbank acquired Dresdner Bank from Allianz, and the German government became owner of one quarter of the merged group's equity capital. As part of the restructuring, Allianz acquired Commerzbank's investment management business, cominvest Asset Management GmbH, which had been formed in 2002 through the merger of ADIG (of which Commerzbank had been majority owner since 1999), Commerzbank Investment Management GmbH (or Commerzinvest, est. 1969), and Commerz Asset Managers GmbH. One driver of the state bailout was the legacy of Commerzbank's ill-fated foray into investment banking in the early 2000s, namely the Commerzbank Securities investment banking unit run by Mehmet Dalman and Roman Schmidt. What was left of Commerzbank Securities was folded into a division of the commercial bank called Commerzbank Corporates and Markets. In total, Commerzbank received an €18 billion ($22.3 billion) state bailout. 

In September 2016, Commerzbank planned to cut 9,600 jobs or about a fifth of its workforce in 4 years. In late 2019, Commerzbank entered into talks with Petrus Advisers to buy its 7.5% stake in Comdirect and take over the entire online bank.

In June 2020, Cerberus Capital Management attacked the firm's leadership team and called for "significant change at the supervisory board, the management board and the company’s strategic plan to stop a 'downward spiral' caused by what the investor said were bloated costs, low profits and managerial inaction." This move triggered the resignation of chairman Stefan Schmittmann and of CEO Martin Zielke. In the second quarter of 2020, the company made an operating profit of €205 million; it was 34 per cent less compared to the same period of 2019. "According to people familiar with the matter", the bank's profit was more affected by the Wirecard scandal than the economic effects of the COVID-19 pandemic. 

In 2021, the bank announced it will reduce the number of branches in Germany from 790 to 450 and cut jobs by 10,000 (a third of its German workforce) by 2024.

Leadership

Chief Executive
 Ernest Müller, Direktor 1874-1891
 Georg Wellge, 1891-1901
 Wilhelm Heintze, 1902-1908
 Gustav Pilster, 1902-1926
 Moritz Schultze, Direktor 1920-1931?
 , 1931-1934
 , 1934-1943
 Fritz Höfermann, Vorstandssprecher of Bankverein Westdeutschland AG, 1952-1958
 Wilhelm Nuber, Vorstandssprecher of Commerz- und Credit-Bank AG, 1952-1958
 Robert Gebhardt, Vorstandssprecher of Commerz- und Disconto-Bank AG, 1952-1958
 Hanns Deuss, Vorstandssprecher for Commerzbank in Düsseldorf, 1958-1961 
 Will Marx, Vorstandssprecher for Northern Germany in Hamburg 1961-1969
 Ernst Rieche, Vorstandssprecher for Southern Germany in Frankfurt 1961-1973
 Paul Lichtenberg, Vorstandssprecher for Western Germany 1961-1973, then for Southern and Western Germany 1973-1976, again interim Vorstandssprecher of Commerzbank in March-May 1981
 Robert Dhom, Vorstandssprecher 1976-1980 
 , Vorstandsvorsitzender 1981-1991
 , Vorstandssprecher 1991-2001 
 Klaus-Peter Müller, Vorstandssprecher 2001-2008 
 Martin Blessing, Vorstandssprecher 2008-2009, then Vorstandsvorsitzender 2009-2016
 Martin Zielke, Vorstandsvorsitzender 2016-2020
 , Vorstandsvorsitzender from

Chair of the supervisory board
 , 1870-1880
 , 1880-1892
 , 1892-1899
 Carl Friedrich Wilhelm Nottebohm, 1899-1915
 , 1915-1934
 , 1934-1943
 , 1943-1946 and 1948-1952
 , 1946-1947
 , chair of Commerz- und Credit-Bank AG 1952-1958
 Wilhelm Wolter, chair of Commerz- und Disconto-Bank AG 1952-1954
 Wilhelm Nottebohm, chair of Commerz- und Disconto-Bank AG 1954-1958
 Otto Schniewind, chair of Bankverein Westdeutschland / Commerzbank-Bankverein 1952-1958 and chair of Commerzbank, 1958-1961 
 Hanns Deuss, 1961-1976
 Paul Lichtenberg, 1976-1988
 Raban von Spiegel, 1988-1991
 , 1991-1999
 Dietrich-Kurt Frowein, 1999-2001
 , 2001-2008
 Klaus-Peter Müller, 2008-2018
 Stefan Schmittmann, 2018-
 , from May 2021

Ownership

As of December 2018, the bank's two largest shareholders were the Government of Germany (15.6%) and Cerberus Capital Management (5.01%).

Operations

Commerzbank is a member of the Cash Group.

Controversies

For more than a decade, Commerzbank was involved in laundering hundreds of billions of U.S. dollars out of Iran, Sudan and Myanmar, against United States sanctions. Commerzbank agreed to pay US$1.5 billion in fines and dismiss several employees for their role in laundering US$253 billion, and for helping the Japanese company Olympus Corporation orchestrate accounting fraud.

The bank has been subject to several corruption investigations, paying US$1.5 billion in fines in 2015.

In 2017, Frankfurt prosecutors, together with federal crime police and tax officials, conducted searches of Commerzbank offices as well as the flats of three suspects in Frankfurt and nearby Hanau. The police raid was about a "tax evasion probe in which several current and former managers are suspected of evading €40 million in taxes via dividend stripping, also known as "cum-ex" transactions". The investigation also extended to trades in 2008 at Dresdner Bank, which was taken over by Commerzbank in 2009. Commerzbank said "it proactively notified the authorities with the preliminary results of that investigation and is cooperating fully". In 2019, Cologne prosecutors again raided Commerzbank's Frankfurt headquarters as part of the criminal investigation.

It was announced in July 2019 that Commerzbank was being investigated by the European Central Bank and BaFin for facilitating its subsidiary mBank's toxic financial product offering in Poland, as well as for the linked potential tax evasion resulting from Commerzbank's financing of mBank's CHF-linked toxic financial products.

See also
 Comdirect Bank

References

External links

 
 

 
Companies formerly listed on the Tokyo Stock Exchange
Companies listed on the Frankfurt Stock Exchange
German brands
Multinational companies headquartered in Germany
Banks established in 1870
C
C
Banks under direct supervision of the European Central Bank
German companies established in 1870
Companies in the MDAX